2002 is a new-age group composed of Pamela, Randy, and Sarah Copus. 2002 has charted twelve albums on the Billboard New Age Charts. This Moment Now won the COVR award for Best New Age Album in 2004. 2002 was named amongst the top new-age artists in Billboards 2003 "Year in Review" issue (December 2003), a list that also featured Yanni, Mannheim Steamroller, Jim Brickman, George Winston, and Enya. They most recently won Best Vocal Album from the ZMR Zone Music Awards in 2015.

The themes of several of 2002's albums are deeply rooted in mythology. Wings is based on the Greek legend of Icarus. Savitri and The Emerald Way are both inspired by the ancient Hindu story of Savitri and Satyavan from the Mahabharata. Land of Forever is a ballad of the mystic island of Tír na nÓg, an Irish legend.

Pamela, Randy, and their daughter Sarah record all their music at their state-of-the-art studio. Randy Copus sings and plays piano, electric cello, guitar, bass, and keyboards. Pamela Copus sings and plays flutes, harp, keyboards, and a wind instrument called a WX5. Their daughter Sarah sings and plays Celtic harp, violin, baritone ukulele, and piano. Pamela, Randy, and Sarah provide all of the vocals on their albums, recording their voices many, many times and layering them to create a "virtual choir" with a celestial, angelic quality. The vocals also have many dimensions, as words and chants in Sanskrit, Spanish, Gaelic, Latin and Japanese, representing sacred traditions throughout the world, can be heard on their albums.

Discography

Studio albums 
 1992 – Wings (November 1992)
 1995 – Savitri (February 1995)
 1997 – Chrysalis (January 21, 1997)
 1998 – Land of Forever (May 19, 1998)
 2000 – River of Stars (January 11, 2000)
 2002 – Across an Ocean of Dreams (January 22, 2002)
 2003 –  This Moment Now (October 7, 2003)
 2006 – The Emerald Way (January 31, 2006)
 2007 – Deep Still Blue (May 8, 2007)
 Includes a companion DVD of animated oceanic photography and artist interviews
 2007 – Christmas Dreams (November 7, 2007)
 2009 – A Word in the Wind (February 10, 2009)
 Includes a companion DVD of music videos
 2009 – Wings II: Return to Freedom (November 11, 2009)
 2011 – Damayanti (April 12, 2011)
 2012 – Believe (October 16, 2012)
 2014 – Trail of Dreams (October 7, 2014)
 2016 – Celtic Fairy Lullaby (February 19, 2016)
 2018 – A World Away (September 7, 2018)
 2020 – Celtic Fairy Dream (April 24, 2020)
 2021 – Hummingbird (June 11, 2021)
 2023 – Clouds Below (January 7, 2023)

Compilations 
 2002 – The Sacred Well: The Best of 2002 (October 1, 2002)
 Retrospective collection of works, includes 2 original songs

Sarah Copus solo albums 
 2017 – Moorland Winds (April 21, 2017)

See also 
List of ambient music artists

References

External links 
 
 Sarah Copus website
 Amazon
 Facebook
 2002 Blog
 Twitter
 YouTube
 bandcamp
 ReverbNation

Musical groups from Texas
New-age music groups
Musical groups established in 1992
1992 establishments in Texas